Melicertidae is a family of cnidarians belonging to the order Leptothecata.

Genera:
 Melicertoides Kramp, 1959
 Melicertum Oken, 1815
 Netocertoides Mayer, 1900
 Orchistomella Kramp, 1959

References

 
Leptothecata
Cnidarian families